Francis Kittredge Shattuck (March 6, 1824 – September 9, 1898) was the most prominent civic leader in the early history of Berkeley, California, and played an important role in the creation and government of Alameda County as well.  He also served as the fifth mayor of the city of Oakland in 1859, and represented the 4th District in the California State Assembly from 1860-61.  He also represented Oakland Township for many years on the Board of Supervisors of Alameda County, starting in 1857.  He was elected to the board of trustees of the Town of Berkeley in 1884. He was instrumental in founding the First Congregational Church of Oakland.

Biography
Shattuck was born in Crown Point, Essex County in northern New York state.  His mother was Betsy Mather, a descendant of Increase Mather who was the president of Harvard from 1685 to 1701.  His father Weston Shattuck, a native of Massachusetts, was a farmer who died when Francis was 12.  Francis earned a teaching certificate by age 18 and was a schoolteacher for four years.  He then moved to a small town in Vermont and worked as a store clerk, until he heard of the discovery of gold in California.  He and a friend, George Blake, by then also his brother-in-law, took off for California.

In 1852, Shattuck and Blake, and two partners they met in the gold fields, William Hillegass and James Leonard, claimed four adjoining  strips of land in the area that became the central part of Berkeley.  (See Kellersberger's Map)

Shattuck was instrumental in getting the Central Pacific Railroad to construct a branch line into Berkeley in 1876, which connected the community and University of California with the main line and the railroad's ferry to San Francisco.

Shattuck died after he was knocked down by a man exiting from a train that Shattuck was trying to board on Shattuck Avenue.  He was buried with his wife Rosa M. Shattuck, his sisters, and their husbands George Blake, Henry H. Havens and Benjamin F. Lee at the Mountain View Cemetery in Oakland.

Legacy
Shattuck had four sisters, Millicent K. Blake, Elizabeth Havens, Mary A. Shattuck, and Eliza L. Lee. Millicent married Shattuck's original partner, George Blake. Shattuck, though married (wife: Rosa Maria Morse, b. 6/12/1834, d. 9/12/1908), died childless. His estate, including several Berkeley properties, went to his wife and to his nephew, John W. Havens, the son of his sister Elizabeth Helen Shattuck Havens.

The principal avenue in the city of Berkeley, Shattuck Avenue, is named for him, as is a smaller street, Kittredge.  The Hotel Shattuck Plaza occupies the site of his original home.

References

Berkeley, California: the story of the evolution of a hamlet into a city of culture and commerce by William Warren Ferrier,  Imprint Berkeley, Calif. (1933)
Berkeley Gazette, September 10, 1898, page 1
Berkeley: The Town and the Gown of It, by George A. Pettitt, Howell-North Books, Berkeley (1973)

External links
Hotel Shattuck Plaza history
Advertisement in the 1919 Automobile Blue Book (publ. 1918)

1824 births
1898 deaths
People from Crown Point, New York
Mayors of Oakland, California
Members of the California State Assembly
Burials at Mountain View Cemetery (Oakland, California)
19th-century American politicians